Natranaerobaculum is a Gram-positive, obligately alkaliphilic, anaerobic, thermotolerant, halotolerant and spore-forming genus of bacteria from the family of Natranaerobiaceae with one known species (Natranaerobaculum magadiense). Natranaerobaculum magadiense has been isolated from sediments from the Lake Magadi in Kenya.

References 

Bacteria genera
Monotypic bacteria genera
Natranaerobiales
Taxa described in 2013
Bacteria described in 2013